City Golf is a village and resort in the Canelones Department of southern Uruguay.

Location
It is located on the north side of Ruta Interbalnearia, between Atlántida and Estación Atlántida.

Population
In 2011 City Golf had a population of 1,104.
 
Source: Instituto Nacional de Estadística de Uruguay

References

External links
INE map of Villa Argentina, Atlántida, Estación Atlántida, Las Toscas, City Golf, and Fortin de Santa Rosa

Populated places in the Canelones Department